Alexandros Safarikas (Greek: Αλέξανδρος Σαφαρίκας; born 26 August 1999) is a Greek professional footballer who plays as a goalkeeper for Swiss club FC Sion.

Career 
He began his career by playing for local team Nirea Verias. In 2015, Safarikas joined the youth system of Veria, the major team of the town. He was part of the academy for two years. On 30 April 2017, at the age of 17, he made his debut for the main team, playing in the Greek Superleague, against Xanthi. On 8 June 2017, Safarikas left Veria and joined AEL. After being released from AEL for the 2018–19 season, he joined Italian team Lecco on 7 September 2018. On 6 October 2020, he was loaned to Swiss Challenge League club Chiasso on a two-year loan deal.

At the end of the 2020–21 season, with Chiasso bought Safarikas, but due to the teams relegation, he instantly was loaned to Swiss Super League club Sion for the 2021–22 season, with the option of purchasing him in summer 2022.

References

External links
superleaguegreece.net
alexandreia-gidas.gr
glovespot.net
youtube.com (video highlights)
footballdatabase.eu

1999 births
Living people
Footballers from Veria
Greek footballers
Greek expatriate footballers
Association football goalkeepers
Athlitiki Enosi Larissa F.C. players
Veria F.C. players
Calcio Lecco 1912 players
FC Chiasso players
Super League Greece players
Serie C players
Serie D players
Greek expatriate sportspeople in Italy
Greek expatriate sportspeople in Switzerland
Expatriate footballers in Italy
Expatriate footballers in Switzerland